Aish Tor is a small tor above the northern side of the Dart Gorge in Dartmoor, Devon, England, that is accessed by Dr. Blackall's Drive from Newbridge Hill. The actual 'tor' is small and flat and generally hard to pin-point.
Nearby tors include: 
Sharp Tor
Leigh Tor
Mel Tor
Luckey Tor
Bel Tor

References

Tors of Dartmoor